Brook Jason Leonard (born ) is a United States Air Force major general who serves as the director of operations of Combined Joint Task Force–Space Operations. He previously served as the chief of staff of the United States Space Command. A fighter pilot, he has commanded the 321st Air Expeditionary Wing, 56th Fighter Wing, and 51st Fighter Wing.

Leonard entered the Air Force in May 1992 as a graduate of the United States Air Force Academy. In his current position, Leonard is the principal advisor to the commander and vice commander of the United States Space Force and directs the activities of the command staff in order to deter aggression and develop combat-ready forces prepared to fight for and preserve United States and allied space superiority. He also chairs numerous boards, oversees the command's corporate process, and serves as the director of the commander's staff.

Education
 1992 Bachelor of Science degree in aeronautical engineering, U.S. Air Force Academy, Colorado Springs, Colo.
 1998 USAF Weapons School, F-16 Weapons Instructor Course, Nellis AFB, Nev.
 1999 Squadron Officer School, Maxwell AFB, Ala.
 2005 Master of Military Operational Art and Science degree, Air Command and Staff College, Maxwell AFB, Ala.
 2006 Master of Airpower Art and Science degree, School of Advanced Air and Space Studies, Maxwell AFB, Ala.
 2010 Master of Strategic Studies degree, U.S. Army War College, Carlisle Barracks, Pa.
 2016 Enterprise Leadership Seminar, Kenan-Flagler Business School, University of North Carolina, Chapel Hill
 2017 Joint Force Air Component Commander Course, Maxwell AFB, Ala.
 2017 Joint Flag Officer Warfighting Course, Maxwell AFB, Ala.

Assignments
1. May 1992 – December 1993, Student, Euro-NATO Joint Jet Pilot Training, Sheppard AFB, Texas
2. January 1994 – February 1995, Student, F-16 Initial Qualification Course, Luke AFB, Ariz.
3. February 1995 – July 1996, Assistant Weapons Officer, 74th Fighter Squadron, Pope AFB, N.C.
4. July 1996 – July 1998, Flight Commander, 36th Fighter Squadron, Osan AB, South Korea
5. July 1998 – December 1998, Student, USAF Weapons School Instructor Course, Nellis AFB, Nev.
6. January 1999 – July 1999, Chief of Weapons, 36th Fighter Squadron, Osan AB, South Korea
7. August 1999 – January 2002, Wing Weapons Officer, 35th Fighter Wing, Misawa AB, Japan
8. January 2002 – July 2004, Assistant Director of Operations and F-16 Weapons Instructor Pilot, USAF Weapons School, F-16 Division, Nellis AFB, Nev.
9. July 2004 – July 2005, Student, Air Command and Staff College, Maxwell AFB, Ala.
10. July 2005 – July 2006, Student, School of Advanced Air and Space Studies, Maxwell AFB, Ala.
11. September 2006 – June 2007, Director of Operations, 18th Fighter Squadron, Eielson AFB, Alaska
12. June 2007 – June 2009, Commander, 16th Weapons Squadron, Nellis AFB, Nev.
13. June 2009 – June 2010, Student, U.S. Army War College, Carlisle Barracks, Pa.
14. June 2010 – July 2012, Division Chief, Iran and Levant Division, Joint Staff (J5), Deputy Directorate Political-Military Affairs Middle East, the Pentagon, Arlington, Va.
15. July 2012 – July 2013, Commander, 451st Expeditionary Operations Group, Kandahar, Afghanistan
16. July 2013 – June 2015, Commander, 51st Fighter Wing, Osan AB, South Korea
17. June 2015 – July 2016, Senior Military Assistant to the Secretary of the Air Force, Arlington, Va.
18. July 2016 – June 2018, Commander, 56th Fighter Wing, Luke AFB, Ariz.
19. July 2018 – July 2019, Director of Air Operations, Combined Joint Task Force – Operation INHERENT RESOLVE; Commander, 321st Air Expeditionary Wing; Commander, Task Force - Air; and Deputy Commander 9th Air Expeditionary Task Force – Levant, Union III, Baghdad, Iraq
20. July 2019 – August 2019, Chief of Staff, Joint Force Space Component Command, Peterson AFB, Colo.
21. August 2019 – August 2022, Chief of Staff, United States Space Command, Peterson AFB, Colo.
22. September 2022 – November 2022, Special Assistant to the Commander, United States Space Command, Peterson AFB, Colo.
23. November 2022 – present, Director of Operations, Combined Joint Task Force–Space Operations

Awards and decorations

Effective dates of promotion

References

Living people
United States Air Force Academy alumni
Air Command and Staff College alumni
School of Advanced Air and Space Studies alumni
United States Army War College alumni
Recipients of the Legion of Merit
Year of birth missing (living people)